Jalal Marri railway station is located in Jalal Marri village, Sanghar district of Sindh, Pakistan.

See also
 List of railway stations in Pakistan
 Pakistan Railways

References
ِ

External links

Railway stations in Pakistan
Sanghar District
Railway stations on Karachi–Peshawar Line (ML 1)